Henryk Siedlecki (born 4 October 1943) is a former Polish politician and footballer. He served as a member of the Sejm during its first and second terms, and as a footballer played for Lechia Gdańsk.

Biography

Siedlecki was born in Mgoszcz in 1943 going on to study at a school for mechanical engineering. Before his days in Politics, Siedlecki played football and is documented to have spent time with Lechia Gdańsk. He made only one appearance for Lechia, coming on 12 March 1967 against Górnik Wałbrzych in the II liga. He worked as a farmer and eventually turned his attention towards politics. He first stood in the 1991 Polish parliamentary election standing for the Polish People's Party in the Elbląg and Olsztyn electoral district. Siedlecki won his seat and served on the 1st Polish Sejm. During this time his main parliamentary duties were on the "Committee on Spatial, Construction and Housing Policy" and the "Committee on Agriculture and Food Economy". He stood again for the 1993 election, again winning his seat and having the same role as before. He ended up losing his place in the Sejm during the 1997 elections and focused more towards local politics in the Elbląg area.

Personal life

It is stated in his Sejm archived documentation that Siedlecki is married and that he can speak Russian.

References

1943 births
Members of the Polish Sejm 1991–1993
Members of the Polish Sejm 1993–1997
Lechia Gdańsk players
Polish footballers
Association football goalkeepers
Living people